Boschella is a genus of checkered beetles in the family Cleridae. There is one described species in Boschella, B. fasciata.

References

Further reading

 
 

Enopliinae
Articles created by Qbugbot